Eugenia Volodina (September 23, 1984) is a Russian model.

Career

Her runway credits include top fashion houses and designers like Alberta Ferretti, Alexander McQueen, Anna Sui, Balenciaga, Balmain, Blumarine, Bottega Veneta, Calvin Klein, Céline, Chanel, Chloé, Christian Dior, Diane von Fürstenberg, Dolce & Gabbana, Donna Karan, DSquared², Emanuel Ungaro, Emilio Pucci, Etro, Fendi, Givenchy, Gucci, Hermès, Jean-Paul Gaultier, Jil Sander, Kenzo, Lanvin, Loewe, Louis Vuitton, Marc Jacobs, Max Mara, Michael Kors, Missoni, Miu Miu, Moschino, Nina Ricci, Prada, Proenza Schouler, Ralph Lauren, Roberto Cavalli, Salvatore Ferragamo, Sonia Rykiel, Stella McCartney, Valentino, Versace, Viktor & Rolf and Yves Saint Laurent.

She is back on the runway at Balmain F/W 2017 fashion show, during Paris Fashion Week.

References

External links

Eugenia Volodina on Instagram.

Living people
Russian female models
People from Kazan
1984 births